Asheboro Hosiery Mills and Cranford Furniture Company Complex, also known as Cranford Industries and National Chair Company, is a historic textile mill and furniture factory complex located at Asheboro, Randolph County, North Carolina.  The complex includes three brick industrial buildings erected from 1917 through the 1940s and the Cranford Industries Office, constructed in 1925.  Also on the property are the contributing Cranford Industries Smokestack built in the 1950s and a lumber shed erected in the late-1950s.

It was added to the National Register of Historic Places in 2011.

References

Textile mills in North Carolina
Industrial buildings and structures on the National Register of Historic Places in North Carolina
Moderne architecture in North Carolina
Industrial buildings completed in 1917
Buildings and structures in Randolph County, North Carolina
National Register of Historic Places in Randolph County, North Carolina